This is a list of aviation-related events from 1929:

Events 
 Greatest number of fatal civil aircraft crashes in US history.
 Cubana de Aviación begins service.
 Pan American World Airways begins service.
 The Canadian Siskins aerobatic team is formed.
 First official airmail to the Mackenzie District of Canada's western Arctic by bushpilot.
 Airway Beacon is built in St. Paul, Minnesota. It still exists in Indian Mounds Park.
 Aircraft Development Corporation changes its name to the Detroit Aircraft Corporation.
 Consolidated Aircraft Corporation absorbs the Thomas-Morse Aircraft Corporation.
 In response to the creation of the Curtiss-Wright Corporation, the United Aircraft and Transport Corporation is formed as a holding company controlling the stock of the Boeing Airplane Company, the Chance Vought Corporation, the Hamilton Aero Manufacturing Company, and the Pratt & Whitney Aircraft Company, soon joined by the Sikorsky Aviation Corporation, the Stearman Aircraft Company, the Standard Steel Propeller Company, and several airlines managed by the new United Air Lines, Inc. management company.
 The Imperial Japanese Navy begins to gather information on aerial techniques, training, and aircraft necessary for dive bombing.
 The Royal Swedish Navy assigns a ship to aviation service for the first time.
 Saunders-Roe Limited, also known as Saro, is formed.

January
 The Cierva C.8W autogyro makes the first autogyro flight in the United States, at Willow Grove, Pennsylvania.
 January 1 – The Government of Poland creates LOT Polish Airlines as a state-owned, self-governing corporation.
 January 1–7 – Carl Spaatz and four other United States Army Air Corps fliers set an endurance record of 151 hours aloft in the modified Atlantic-Fokker C-2A Question Mark.
 January 27 – The United States Navy aircraft carrier  carries out a successful simulated dawn raid on the Panama Canal in a training exercise.
 January 30 – Inter-Island Airways, the future Hawaiian Airlines, is founded.

February
 Harold Pitcairn purchases the U.S. rights to all of Juan de la Cierva′s autogiro inventions and patents then in existence and establishes the Pitcairn-Cierva Autogiro Company.
 February 4
With Oscar Grubb aboard as flight engineer, Frank Hawks sets a transcontinental airspeed record for a flight across the continental United States  while ferrying the Lockheed Air Express (registration NR7955) from the Lockheed factory in Burbank, California, to an air show in New York City, making the flight in 18 hours 21 minutes.
Henry Berliner and Temple Nach Joyce found the Berliner-Joyce Aircraft Corporation.

March
The three men spend four days repairing and lightening the plane and clearing a path to the edge of the plateau, after which they roll it off the edge, Mermoz dives to gain airspeed, and they arrive safely in Santiago. The event is widely celebrated. 
 March 13 – The Spanish government airline CLASSA is formally established as a company, formed by the merger of Iberia and several other Spanish airlines.
 March 17 – The Colonial Western Airways Ford 4-AT-B Trimotor NC7683 suffers a double engine failure during its initial climb after takeoff from Newark Airport in Newark, New Jersey. It fails to gain height and crashes into a railroad freight car loaded with sand, killing 14 of the 15 people on board the aircraft. At the time, this is the deadliest airplane accident in American history.
 March 19 – The newly completed Ford 5-AT-B Trimotor NC9674, which had made its first flight only five days earlier, crashes when its wing strikes the ground on landing while it returns to Ford Airport in Dearborn, Michigan, during a Ford Motor Company flight prior to delivery to its customer. All four people on board die.
 March 30 – Imperial Airways commences the first scheduled air service between the United Kingdom and British India.

April
 April 2–6 – Flying a biplane in support of rebel forces during the Escobar Rebellion in Mexico, Irish pilot Patrick Murphy makes a number of bombing raids against Naco in the Mexican state of Sonora in which he mistakenly drops bombs across the border in the United States on three occasions, damaging several buildings and destroying a car in neighboring Naco, Arizona. It is the first time in history that U.S. territory has come under aerial bombing attack by a foreign aircraft.
 April 21 – A United States Army Air Corps Boeing PW-9D fighter, 28-037, performing stunts over San Diego, California, attempts to pass in front of the Maddux Air Lines Ford 5-AT-B Trimotor NC9636, which is on a scheduled passenger flight from San Diego to Phoenix, Arizona. The PW-9D strikes the Trimotor's cockpit, and both aircraft crash, killing the PW-9D pilot and all five people aboard the airliner.
 April 24–26 – Royal Air Force Squadron Leader Arthur G. Jones-Williams and Flight Lieutenant Norman H. Jenkins make the first non-stop flight from the United Kingdom to British India, using a Fairey Long-Range Monoplane. The flight, from RAF Cranwell to Karachi, covers  nonstop in 50 hours 48 minutes, falling  short of the world nonstop flight distance record.

May
 May 16 – At the first Academy Awards ceremony, the first award in history for Outstanding Picture (later renamed "Best Picture") goes to an aviation-themed film, the 1927 silent film Wings about two fighter pilots in World War I.
 May 20 – The Peruvian Armys aviation branch and the Peruvian Navys Naval Aviation Corps are combined to form the Peruvian Aviation Corps, forerunner of the Peruvian Air Force.
 May 25 – The Spanish government airline CLASSA officially assumes all the rights, obligations, fleets, and staff of Iberia and the other airlines that merged to form it.
 May 26 – Flying a Junkers W 34 be/b3e (registration D-1119), Friedrich W. Neuenhofen sets a new world altitude record, reaching . 
 May 30 – Logan Field is opened at Baltimore, Maryland.

June
 Thirty-five Regia Aeronautica (Italian Royal Air Force) seaplanes – 32 Savoia-Marchetti S.55s, two Savoia-Marchetti S.59s, and one CANT 22 – led by General Italo Balbo and famed Italian aviator Francesco de Pinedo make a 3,300-mile (5,314-km) mass-formation flight circuiting the Eastern Mediterranean, with stops at Taranto, Italy; Athens, Greece; Istanbul, Turkey; Varna, Bulgaria; Odessa in the Soviet Union; and Constanta, Romania. The flight is intended to improve the operational skills of Regia Aeronautica aircrews and ground crewmen, showcase the Italian aviation industry to potential foreign buyers of Italian-made aircraft, and enhance the prestige of Benito Mussolinis Italian Fascist government.
 Frank Hawks sets a transcontinental airspeed record for a flight across the continental United States, flying the Lockheed Air Express Texaco Five (registration NR7955) across the country in 17 hours 38 minutes.
 June 13 – The United States Coast Guard establishes an "air traffic flight-following" capability along the coast of the continental United States employing a network of Coast Guard radio stations.
 June 17
 Delta Air Lines begins passenger service (as Delta Air Service) with a first flight from Dallas, Texas to Jackson, Mississippi, with stops at Shreveport and Monroe, Louisiana. 
 The Imperial Airways Handley Page W.10 City of Ottawa (G-EBMT) suffers an engine failure and ditches in the English Channel off Dungeness, England. Seven of the 13 people aboard die; the Belgian fishing trawler Gaby rescues the six survivors, all of whom are injured.
 June 21 – A Spanish Air Force crew led by pilot Major Ramón Franco – brother of future Spanish dictator Francisco Franco – takes off from Los Alcázares, Spain, in the Dornier Do J Wal ("Whale") flying boat Numancia to attempt a westward flight around the world, intending to begin with an overnight flight to their first stop at the Azores. They overshoot the Azores, run out of fuel, and forced to land in the North Atlantic Ocean on June 22, where they drift until picked up by the Royal Navy aircraft carrier  on June 29. Their round-the-world attempt is scrubbed.
 June 29 – The Curtiss Aeroplane and Motor Company and the Wright Aeronautical Corporation merge to form the Curtiss-Wright Corporation. The new corporation constructs light aircraft at the Curtiss plant in Buffalo, New York; heavy aircraft and flying boats at its Keystone Aircraft Corporation subsidiary in Bristol, Pennsylvania; civil aircraft at its Curtiss-Robertson subsidiary in St. Louis, Missouri; and Curtiss and Wright aircraft engines at the Wright factory in Paterson, New Jersey.

July
 In an article entitled "Is Flying Safe?" in the July 1929 issue of Scientific American, Irish aviator Mary, Lady Heath, writes that the most important factors in making airline travel safe are well-trained pilots and strict construction standards for aircraft.
 July 3
Lieutenant A. W. Gordon hooks a Vought UO-1 onto the United States Navy airship  in successful parasite fighter experiments.
The airline Aeropostal Alas de Venezuela (LAV) is founded in Venezuela. It begins operations with a fleet of three Latécoère 28s.
 July 4 – The Japanese aviator Masashi Goto crashes and is killed in Utah's Uinta Mountains in the beginning stages of an attempted flight around the world by crossing the continents of North America, Europe, and Asia.
 July 7 – Transcontinental Air Transport commences a regular service transporting passengers all the way across the United States in 48 hours, using a combination of trains and aircraft for different legs of the journey.
 July 13
 The French aviators Dieudonné Costes and Maurice Bellonte take off from Villacoublay, France, in an attempt to fly across the North Atlantic Ocean to New York, New York. Bad weather will force them to turn back after 17 hours.
 The Polish aviator Ludwik Idzikowski crashes in the Azores and dies while attempting a westbound transatlantic flight.
 July 17 – Delta Air Lines starts commercial airline operations.
 July 22 – Deutsche Luft Hansa uses a catapult to launch a Heinkel He 12 mail plane from the passenger liner Bremen, ; 216 nautical miles) out of New York, New York, speeding the mail on its way before the ship reaches port.

August
 To address an outbreak of Arab raids against Jewish villages in Palestine, the British aircraft carrier HMS Courageous arrives off Jaffa and disembarks all of her aircraft to operate from a desert landing strip at Gaza. They operate over Palestine for four weeks before reembarking aboard Courageous in September.
 August 4–16 – The first International Tourist Aircraft Contest Challenge 1929 takes place in Paris, with a  race over Europe. The German crew of Fritz Morzik wins in the BFW M.23 plane.
 August 8–29 – German rigid airship LZ 127 Graf Zeppelin makes a circumnavigation of the Northern Hemisphere eastabout out of Lakehurst, New Jersey, including the first nonstop flight of any kind across the Pacific Ocean (Tokyo–Los Angeles).
 August 18 – The Imperial Ethiopian Air Force receives its first aircraft, a Potez 25-A2.
 August 29 – While Mary, Lady Heath, practices for the National Air Races in Cleveland, Ohio, the aircraft she is piloting clips a chimney and crashes through a factory roof. She spends weeks in a coma, but recovers from her injuries.

September
 September 3 – The Transcontinental Air Transport Ford 5-AT-B Trimotor City of San Francisco (registration NC9649) strikes Mount Taylor near Grants, New Mexico, during a thunderstorm while on a scheduled passenger flight from Albuquerque Airport in Albuquerque, New Mexico, to Los Angeles, California, killing all eight people on board.
 September 6
The Imperial Airways de Havilland DH.66 Hercules G-EBMZ stalls when it flares too early while attempting a night landing at Jask Airport in Jask, Persia. It crashes and bursts into flames when its wing fuel tanks rupture and emergency flares in its wingtips ignite the fuel. Both crew members and one of the three passengers die. The deceased pilot, A. E. Woodbridge, had shot down and wounded the German fighter ace Manfred von Richthofen during World War I.
The 1929 Schneider Trophy race is flown at Calshot Spit in the United Kingdom.
 September 11 – Guatemala establishes the Dirección General de Aeronáutica Civil ("General Directorate of Civil Aeronautics") as its national civil aviation authority.
 September 12 – The Italian Fascist leader Italo Balbo becomes Italy′s minister of the air force.
 September 24 – United States Army Air Corps Lieutenant Jimmy Doolittle makes a completely blind take-off, flight, and landing.
 September 27–29 – Dieudonné Costes and Maurice Bellonte set a new world distance record, flying  from Le Bourget, Paris, France, to Qiqihar, Manchuria, China, in a Breguet 19.
 September 30 – Fritz von Opel pilots the rocket-powered RAK.1 aircraft on a 75-second,  flight near Frankfurt-am-Main, Germany.

October
October 6 – Inter-Island Airways – the future Hawaiian Airlines – begins operations.
October 7 – The Kingdom of Yugoslavia′s flag carrier, Aeroput, makes its first international flight, flown by a Potez 29/2 from Belgrade, Yugoslavia, to Vienna, Austria, via Zagreb, Yugoslavia, with five passengers on board.
October 14 – The British airship R101 makes its first flight. It takes off from Cardington, Bedfordshire, and flies over London.
October 17 – Denver Municipal Airport – the future Stapleton International Airport – opens in Denver, Colorado. It will serve as Denver's primary airport until it closes in February 1995.
October 20 – The airfield at Naval Air Station Glenview, located in Glenview, Illinois, is dedicated, and its hangar deemed the largest in the world.
October 26 – During a scheduled passenger flight from Naples International Airport in Naples, Italy, to Genoa Cristoforo Colombo Airport outside Genoa, Italy, the Imperial Airways Short S.8/1 Calcutta flying boat City of Rome (registration G-AADN) makes a forced landing in high winds and poor weather in the Ligurian Sea off La Spezia, Italy. It sinks during efforts to tow it to shore, killing all seven people on board.

November

 November 6 – After taking off from Croydon Airport in London, England, with nine people aboard for a scheduled passenger flight to Amsterdam in the Netherlands, the Deutsche Luft Hansa Junkers G 24bi Oberschlesien (registration D-903) crashes after striking trees on a hill in Marden Park, Surrey, while attempting to return to Croydon in thick fog. Three of the four crew members and four of the five passengers die.
 November 9 – American aviation pioneer Carl Ben Eielson and his mechanic Earl Borland die in the crash of their plane in Siberia while attempting to evacuate furs and personnel from the Nanuk, a cargo ship trapped in the ice at North Cape (now Mys Shmidta).
 November 25 – The Spanish government airline CLASSA officially begins operation of all lines previously operated by the airlines that merged to form it, including Iberia.
 November 26 – After taking off from Hal Far, Malta, a Fleet Air Arm of the Royal Air Force Fairey Flycatcher lands aboard the British aircraft carrier , achieving the first night carrier landing by a fleet fighter.
 November 27–28 – Richard Evelyn Byrd and crew make the first flight over the South Pole in a Ford Trimotor.

December
 December 16
 The British airship R100 makes its first flight, from Howden to Cardington, England.
 Tydeo Larre Borges is the first South American pilot to cross the South Atlantic Ocean.
 December 17 – Royal Air Force Captain Arthur G. Jones-Williams and Lieutenant Norman H. Jenkins set out from RAF Cranwell in England in the Fairey Long-Range Monoplane to set a new nonstop flight distance record by flying to South Africa. The flight ends in tragedy later in the day when their plane crashes into Mount Sainte Marie du Zit in the Atlas Mountains in French Tunisia at an altitude of  after 13 hours 40 minutes in the air, killing both of them. 
 December 20 – Will Kirk Kaynor, a member of the United States House of Representatives representing the 2nd Congressional District of Massachusetts, dies in the crash of a United States Army Air Corps plane at Bolling Field in Washington, D.C. It was his first time in an airplane.

First flights 
 Aeronca C-2
 Avia BH-11 (Czechoslovak air arm designation Avia B.11)
 Bellanca CH-300 Pacemaker
 Bellanca TES
 Cessna DC-6
 Cierva C.12
 Cierva C.19
 Curtiss Thrush
 Fairchild FB-3
 Farman F.200
 Hall XFH
 Heinkel HD 56, prototype of the Aichi E3A
 Levasseur PL.14
 Macchi M.67
 Piaggio P.9
 Pitcairn PA-7
 Potez 36
 Southern Martlet
 Early 1929
Thomas-Morse XP-13 Viper
Westland Interceptor
 Spring 1929 – Levasseur PL.10

January
 Gloster Gauntlet
 January 27 – Saunders A.10

February
 February 1 – Lublin R-X
 February 13 – Junkers A50
 February 22 – Westland IV, prototype of the Westland Wessex trimotor airliner

April
 April 3 – Cunningham-Hall PT-6 
 April 11 – Boeing P-12

May
 Pietenpol Air Camper homebuilt aircraft prototype, with Ford Model A engine
 Polikarpov DI-2
 May 3  – Gee Bee Model A

June
 June 11 – Vickers Type 143
 June 21 – Vought XF2U-1

July
 Bernard 20
 Fokker D.XVI
 RWD-2
 July 4 – Saro A17 Cutty Sark
 July 7 – Marinens Flyvebaatfabrikk M.F.10
 July 29 – Dornier Do X

August
 PZL P.1

September
 Avro 621 Tutor
 September 9 – De Havilland Puss Moth
 September 11 – Tupolev R-6
 September 15 – Junkers K 47
 September 17 – Adcox Student Prince

October
 Berliner-Joyce XP-16, prototype of the Berliner-Joyce P-16 (later PB-1)
 October 2 – Acme Sportsman
 October 14 – Airship R101

November
 November 6 – Junkers G.38
 November 26 – Vickers Type 177

December
 Hall XPH-1, prototype of the Hall PH
 Nakajima A2N
 December 16 – R100
 December 28 – Mitsubishi B2M

Entered service 
 Butler Blackhawk
 Curtiss P-6 Hawk with the 27th Pursuit Squadron, United States Army Air Corps
 Nakajima A1N with the Imperial Japanese Navy
 Polikarpov I-3 with 4th and 7th Fighter Squadrons, Soviet Air Force
 Polikarpov U-2, later redesignated Polikarpov Po-2 (NATO reporting name "Mule")
 Tupolev TB-1 with the VVS

February
 February 27 – Boeing P-12 with the United States Army Air Corps

May
 Bristol Bulldog with No. 3 Squadron, Royal Air Force

June
 Boeing F4B with the United States Navy

October
 Handley Page Hinaidi with the Royal Air Force

Retirements 
 Avro 555 Bison by the Royal Air Force
 Latécoère 15 by Lignes Aériennes Latécoère
 Saunders A.3 Valkyrie
 Saunders A.4 Medina

Notes 

 
Aviation by year